Alexander Kolodin is an American lawyer, politician and Republican member of the Arizona House of Representatives elected to represent District 3 in 2022.

Early life & education
Kolodin graduated from Georgetown University, prior to becoming an English and civics teacher. He then attended law school at the University of Pennsylvania. He was a Reagan Fellow at the Goldwater Institute, and also owned his own law practice.

Elections
2022 Kolodin and Joseph Chaplik won a crowded primary, including defeating former State Representative Darin Mitchell. They went on to run unopposed in the general election.

References

External links
 Biography at Ballotpedia

Republican Party members of the Arizona House of Representatives
Living people
Year of birth missing (living people)
21st-century American politicians
People from Scottsdale, Arizona
Georgetown University alumni